Petar Daraktchiev (born 11 March 1943) is a Bulgarian boxer. He competed in the men's light welterweight event at the 1964 Summer Olympics. At the 1964 Summer Olympics, he lost to Vladimír Kučera of Czechoslovakia.

References

1943 births
Living people
Bulgarian male boxers
Olympic boxers of Bulgaria
Boxers at the 1964 Summer Olympics
Place of birth missing (living people)
Light-welterweight boxers